Horace Evelyn Crawfurd (13 January 1881 – 14 March 1958) was a Liberal Party politician in the United Kingdom.

Professional career
Crawfurd was a lecturer at Liverpool University. In 1930, Elinor Glyn Ltd employed Crawfurd to undertake the publicity campaign for two movies: Knowing Men (1930), which experimented with a new colour process, and The Price of Things (1931). Crawfurd also worked with the author Elinor Glyn on her own personal publicity.

Political career
In 1913, Crawfurd was selected as the Liberal candidate for Southport for a general election expected to take place in 1914 or 1915. However, the election was postponed due to the Great War. He became a Flight Sub-Lieutenant in the Royal Naval Air Service and was stationed in the Far East. He continued to nurse the Southport constituency while on leave in anticipation of being selected as the candidate when the election was finally held. However, the Conservative MP for Southport, received endorsement from the Coalition Prime Minister David Lloyd George, so the Southport Liberals decided not to run a candidate against him. He unsuccessfully contested the Walthamstow West constituency at the 1922 and 1923 general elections, before winning the seat at the 1924 general election, narrowly defeating the sitting Labour MP Valentine McEntee. During the 1924-29 parliament which was dominated by a Conservative majority, Crawfurd worked closely with a group of radical Liberal MPs that included: William Wedgwood Benn, Percy Harris, Joseph Kenworthy and Frank Briant to provide opposition to the government. However, McEntee regained the seat at the 1929 general election. He stood again at the Islington East by-election in February 1931, where he finished in fourth place. He stood for election for the last time at the 1935 general election, when he finished last out of the three candidates in Leicester West. He did not stand for Parliament again.

Electoral record

References

External links

1881 births
1958 deaths
Alumni of the University of Liverpool
Liberal Party (UK) MPs for English constituencies
UK MPs 1924–1929